Favorites or Favourites refers to a saved list of internet bookmarks in the Internet Explorer browser.

Favorites or Favourites may also refer to:
 Favorites (Crystal Gayle album), 1980
 Favorites (Johnny Gill album), 1997
 Favorites (Jolin Tsai album), 2006
 Favourites, 1991 and 2001 albums by Ladysmith Black Mambazo
 Favorites, 1994 EP by Shonen Knife

See also
 Favorite (disambiguation)
 Favorites and Rarities, a 1993 album by Don McLean
 Faves, an album by Renée Geyer